The Masked Singer (lit. Maska) is a Russian reality singing competition television series based on the Masked Singer franchise which originated from the South Korean version of the show King of Mask Singer. It premiered on NTV on 1 March 2020.

Jury and presenter

Jury timeline

Presenter

Series overview

Season 1

Contestants 

  Winner
  Second place
  Third place
  Fourth place
  The Mask won in their group or duel
  The Mask stayed in the show
  The Mask became a knockout nominee, but was saved by the viewers
  The Mask became a knockout nominee, but was saved by the jury 
  The Mask became a knockout nominee, but was saved by the jury's decision 
  The Mask became a knockout nominee, but was saved by the HbbTV vote
  Special guest
  The Mask was eliminated and unmasked

Episodes

Episode 1 (1 March)

Episode 2 (8 March)

Episode 3 (15 March)

Episode 4 (22 March)

Episode 5 (29 March)

Episode 6 (5 April)

Episode 7 (12 April)

Episode 8 (19 April)

Final (26 April)

New Years Episode (31 December 2020 ― 1 January 2021)

Season 2

Contestants

  Winner
  Second place
  Third place
  Fourth place
  The Mask won in their group or duel
  The Mask stayed in the show
  The Mask became a knockout nominee, but was saved by the viewers
  The Mask became a knockout nominee, but was saved by the jury's decision 
  The Mask became a knockout nominee, but was saved by the HbbTV vote
  Special guest
  The Mask was eliminated and unmasked

Episodes

Episode 1 (14 February)

Episode 2 (21 February)

Episode 3 (28 February)

Episode 4 (7 March)

Episode 5 (14 March)

Episode 6 (21 March)

Episode 7 (28 March)

Episode 8 (4 April)

Episode 9 (11 April)

Episode 10 (18 April)

Episode 11 (25 April)

Final (2 May)

New Years Episode (31 December 2021 ― 1 January 2022)

Season 3

Contestants

  Winner
  Second place
  Third place
  Fourth place
  The Mask won in their group or duel
  The Mask stayed in the show
  The Mask became a knockout nominee, but was saved by the viewers
  The Mask became a knockout nominee, but was saved by the jury's decision 
  Special guest
  The Mask was eliminated and unmasked

Episodes

Episode 1 (13 February)

Episode 2 (20 February)

Episode 3 (6 March)

Episode 4 (7 March)

Episode 5 (13 March)

Episode 6 (20 March)

Episode 7 (27 March)

Episode 8 (3 April)

Episode 9 (10 April)

Episode 10 (17 April)

Episode 11 (24 April)

Special episode dedicated to Philipp Kirkorov's birthday (30 April)

Final (1 May)

New Years Episode + Avatar (31 December 2022 ― 1 January 2023)

Season 4

Contestants

  Winner
  Second place
  Third place
  Fourth place
  The Mask won in their group or duel
  The Mask stayed in the show
  The Mask became a knockout nominee, but was saved by the viewers
  The Mask became a knockout nominee, but was saved by the jury's decision 
  Special guest
  The Mask was eliminated and unmasked

Episode

Episode 1 (12 February)

Episode 2 (19 February)

Episode 3 (26 February)

Episode 4 (5 March)

Episode 5 (12 March)

Episode 6 (19 March)

The Masked Dancer
In October 2022, the spinoff show The Masked Dancer began airing on STS, based on the American spinoff franchise The Masked Dancer.

Notes

External links
 

2020 Russian television series debuts
2020s Russian television series
Russian music television series
Russian-language television shows
Russian television series based on South Korean television series
Masked Singer